Rothmannia lujae is a midlevel rainforest tree in the family Rubiaceae which is found in southern Nigeria and western Cameroons  and edging into Congo (Kinshasa). It is primarily interesting for having an eight-inch (20 cm) diameter fruit which requires several years to mature. The tree is up to one hundred feet (30 meters) in height, but only about 20 inches thick (1.6 meters girth).

References 

lujae